Universal suffrage (or franchise) ensures the right to vote for as many people who are bound by a government's laws as possible, as supported by the "one person, one vote" principle. For many, the term universal suffrage assumes the exclusion of youth and non-citizens (among others), while some insist that much more inclusion is needed before suffrage can be called universal. Democratic theorists, especially those hoping to achieve more universal suffrage, support presumptive inclusion, where the legal system would protect the voting rights of all subjects unless the government can clearly prove that disenfranchisement is necessary. 

While this article documents no examples of suffrage having been extended universally (by its most inclusive definition), healthy democracies have slowly expanded voting rights, including to some non-citizens and youth. However, democratic backsliding through voter suppression and election subversion threatens free and fair elections and weakens the power of the voting process. Autocratic governments even hold sham elections to try and pretend that they haven't fully revoked suffrage from their voters.

History

In the first modern democracies, governments restricted the vote to those with property and wealth, which almost always meant a minority of the male population. In some jurisdictions, other restrictions existed, such as requiring voters to practice a given religion. In all modern democracies, the number of people who could vote has increased progressively with time. The 19th century saw many movements advocating "universal [male] suffrage", most notably in Europe, Great Britain and North America. Female suffrage was largely ignored until the latter half of the century, when movements began to thrive; the first of these was in New Zealand, in which all adult women of all ethnicities gained the right to vote in 1893. From there, the movement for the idea of universal suffrage which included women's suffrage spread across British colonies and beyond. 

In the United States, after the principle of "One person, one vote" was established in the early 1960s by U.S. Supreme Court under Earl Warren, the U.S. Congress together with the Warren Court continued to protect and expand the voting rights of all Americans, especially African Americans, through the Civil Rights Act of 1964, Voting Rights Act of 1965 and several Supreme Court rulings. In addition, the term "suffrage" is also associated specifically with women's suffrage in the United States; a movement to extend the franchise to women began in the mid-19th century and culminated in 1920, when the United States ratified the Nineteenth Amendment to the United States Constitution, guaranteeing the right of women to vote. It would be 1928 before voting rights were guaranteed to all women in the UK.

In more detail 
France, under the 1793 Jacobin constitution, was the first major country to enact suffrage for all adult males, though it was never formally used in practice (the constitution was immediately suspended before being implemented, and the subsequent election occurred in 1795 after the fall of the Jacobin government in 1794 discredited most ideas associated with them, including that constitution). Elsewhere in the Francophone world, the Republic of Haiti legislated for universal male suffrage in 1816. The Second French Republic instituted adult male suffrage after the revolution of 1848.

Following the French revolutions, movements in the Western world toward more universal suffrage occurred in the early 19th century, and focused on removing property requirements for voting. In 1867 Germany (the North German Confederation) enacted suffrage for all adult males. In the United States following the American Civil War, slaves were freed and granted rights of citizens, including suffrage for adult males (although several states established restrictions largely, though not completely, diminishing these rights). In the late-19th and early-20th centuries, the focus of the universal suffrage movement came to include the extension of the right to vote to women, as happened from the post-Civil War era in several Western states and during the 1890s in a number of British colonies.

On 19 September 1893 the British Governor of New Zealand, Lord Glasgow, gave assent to a new electoral act, which meant that New Zealand became the first British-controlled colony in which women had the right to vote in parliamentary elections. This was followed shortly after by the colony of South Australia in 1894, which was the second to allow women to vote, but the first colony to permit women to stand for election as well. In 1906, the autonomous Russian territory known as Grand Duchy of Finland (which became the Republic of Finland in 1917) became the first territory in the world to implement unrestricted universal suffrage, as women could stand as candidates, unlike in New Zealand, and without indigenous ethnic exclusion, like in Australia. It also lead to the election of the world's first female members of parliament the following year. Federal states and colonial or autonomous territories prior to World War I have multiple examples of early introduction of universal suffrage. However, these legal changes were effected with the permission of the British, Russian or other government bodies, which were considered the sovereign nation at the time. For this reason, Australia (1901), New Zealand (1908) and Finland (1917) all have different dates of achieving independent nationhood.

The First French Republic adopted universal male suffrage briefly in 1792; it was one of the first national systems that abolished all property requirements as a prerequisite for allowing men to register and vote. Greece recognized full male suffrage in 1844. Spain recognized it in the Constitution of 1869 and France and Switzerland have continuously done so since the 1848 Revolution (for resident male citizens). Upon independence in the 19th century, several Latin-American countries and Liberia in Africa initially extended suffrage to all adult males, but subsequently restricted it based on property requirements. The German Empire implemented full male suffrage in 1871.

In the United States, the Fifteenth Amendment to the United States Constitution, ratified in 1870 during the Reconstruction era, provided that "The right of citizens of the United States to vote shall not be denied or abridged by the United States or by any State on account of race, color, or previous condition of servitude." This amendment aimed to guarantee the right to vote to African Americans, many of whom had been enslaved in the South prior to the end (1865) of the American Civil War and the 1864–1865 abolition of slavery. Despite the amendment, however, blacks were disfranchised in the former Confederate states after 1877; Southern officials ignored the amendment and blocked black citizens from voting through a variety of devices, including poll taxes, literacy tests, and grandfather clauses; violence and terrorism were used to intimidate some would-be voters. Southern blacks did not effectively receive the right to vote until the Voting Rights Act of 1965.

In 1893 the self-governing colony New Zealand became the first country in the world (except for the short-lived 18th-century Corsican Republic) to grant active universal suffrage by giving women the right to vote. It did not grant universal full suffrage (the right to both vote and be a candidate, or both active and passive suffrage) until 1919.

In 1902 the Commonwealth of Australia become the first country to grant full suffrage for women, i.e. the rights both to vote and to run for office. However, Australia did not implement universal suffrage at this time – nationwide voting rights for Aboriginal Australians were not established until 1962, before that varying by state.

Several European nations that had enacted universal suffrage had their normal legal process, or their status as independent nations, interrupted during and after the First World War of 1914–1918.

Many societies in the past have denied or abridged political representation on the basis of race or ethnicity, related to discriminatory ideas about citizenship. For example, in apartheid-era South Africa, non-White people could generally not vote in national elections until the first multi-party elections in 1994. However, a nonracial franchise existed under the Cape Qualified Franchise, which was replaced by a number of separate MPs in 1936 (Blacks) and 1958 (Coloureds). Later, the Tricameral Parliament established separate chambers for Whites, Coloureds and Indians. Rhodesia enacted a similar statute to the former in its proclaimed independence of 1965, which however allowed a smaller number of representatives for the considerably larger Black majority (under its 1961 constitution, the voting classes had been based on socio-economic standards, which marginalized most Black and a few White voters to a separate set of constituencies, under the principle of weighted voting; this was replaced in 1969 by an explicitly racial franchise, with delegated all Blacks to the 'B' voters roll).

Women's suffrage

In Sweden–Finland, women's suffrage was granted during the Age of Liberty from 1718 until 1772.

In Corsica, women's suffrage was granted in 1755 and lasted until 1769.

Women's suffrage (with the same property qualifications as for men) was granted in New Jersey in 1776 (the word "inhabitants" was used instead of "men" in the 1776 Constitution) and rescinded in 1807.

The Pitcairn Islands granted restricted women's suffrage in 1838. Various other countries and states granted restricted women's suffrage in the later half of the nineteenth century, starting with South Australia in 1861.

The first unrestricted women's suffrage in a major country was granted in New Zealand in 1893. The women's suffrage bill was adopted mere weeks before the general election of 1893. Māori men had been granted suffrage in 1867, white men in 1879. The Freedom in the World index lists New Zealand as the only free country in the world in 1893.

South Australia first granted women suffrage and allowed them to stand for parliament in 1894.

In 1906, the autonomous Grand Principality of Finland became the first territory to give women full political rights, i.e. both the right to vote and to run for office, and was the second in the world and the first in Europe to give women the right to vote. The world's first female members of parliament were elected in Finland the following year, 1907.

In 1931, the Second Spanish Republic allowed women the right of passive suffrage with three women being elected.

During a discussion on extending women's right to active suffrage, the Radical Socialist Victoria Kent confronted the Radical Clara Campoamor. Kent argued that Spanish women were not yet prepared to vote and, since they were too influenced by the Catholic Church, they would vote for right-wing candidates. Campoamor however pleaded for women's rights regardless of political orientation. Her point finally prevailed and, in the election of 1933, the political right won with the vote of citizens of any sex over 23. Both Campoamor and Kent lost their seats.

In Switzerland, women's suffrage was introduced at the federal level, by a nationwide (male) referendum in 1971, but the referendum did not give women the right to vote at the local Cantonal level. The Cantons independently voted to grant women the right to vote. The first Canton to give women the right to vote was Vaud in 1959. The last Canton, Appenzell Innerrhoden, had a centuries-old law forbidding women to vote. This was only changed in 1990 when Switzerland's Federal Court ordered the Canton to grant women the right to vote.

Youth suffrage

The movement to lower the voting age many consider an aspect of universal suffrage that the youth rights movement has helped to lead. Organizations such as the National Youth Rights Association are active in the United States to advocate for a lower voting age, with some success, among other issues related to youth rights. A related movement, suffrage for Americans with disabilities provides important precedents and intersectionality with the movement to extend voting rights to children and youth.

Non-citizen suffrage 

While many places extend the right to vote in at least some elections to non-citizens living in their community, many people remain unable to vote based on their citizenship status.

Dates by country
States have granted and revoked universal suffrage at various times.

Note: this chart does not indicate periods of autocratic rule (when voting has little or no power).
 Adult citizens There are no distinctions between citizens over a certain age in any part of its territories due to gender, literacy, wealth, social status, religion, race, or ethnicity.
 Male is for all males over a certain age in the majority ethnic or sectarian group irrespective of literacy, wealth, or social status.
 Female is for when all women over a certain age can vote on the same terms as men.
 Ethnicity is for when all eligible voters over a certain age can vote on the same terms as the majority or politically dominant group irrespective of religion, race, or ethnicity.

Since historically one group or another might have lost suffrage rights only to regain them later on, this table lists the last uninterrupted time from the present a group was granted the right to vote if that group's suffrage has been fully restored.

See also
 Democracy Index
 Equality before the law
 List of suffragists and suffragettes
 List of women's rights activists
 One man, one vote
 One person, one vote
 Suffrage for Americans with disabilities
 Suffragette
 Timeline of women's suffrage
 Umbrella Movement
 2014 Hong Kong protests

Notes

References

Further reading

 Duong, Kevin (2020). "What Was Universal Suffrage?". Theory & Event. 23 (1): 29–65.

External links

 Limited suffrage in England prior to the 1832 reforms
 Finnish centennial celebration
 "Have you heard the news?", a pamphlet published by an anonymous English freeman in 1835
 An address to the middle and working classes engaged in trade and manufactures throughout the empire on the necessity of union at the present crisis (1842) by Richard Gardner

Suffrage
Equality rights
Universalism